Leftover Feelings is an album by John Hiatt with the Jerry Douglas Band, released in May 2021 through the record label New West Records. 

The album was produced by Jerry Douglas. It was recorded at RCA Studio B, and at The Squirrel Nest, in Nashville. It was nominated for a 2022 Grammy Award in the Best Americana Album category.

Track listing
All tracks written by John Hiatt.
 "Long Black Electric Cadillac" – 3:26
 "Mississippi Phone Booth" – 3:06
 "The Music Is Hot" – 3:46
 "All The Lilacs In Ohio" – 3:29
 "I'm In Asheville" – 3:27
 "Light Of The Burning Sun" – 4:38
 "Little Goodnight" – 4:43
 "Buddy Boy" – 3:27
 "Changes In My Mind" – 3:34
 "Keen Rambler" – 3:25
 "Sweet Dream" – 4:29

Personnel
 John Hiatt – acoustic guitar, vocals
 Jerry Douglas – dobro, lap steel guitar, background vocals
 Daniel Kimbro – bass, tic-tac bass, string arrangements
 Mike Seal – acoustic guitar, electric guitar
 Christian Sedelmyer – violin, string arrangements
 Carmella Ramsey – background vocals

Chart performance

References

John Hiatt albums
New West Records albums
2021 albums